Jangdan-myeon is a myeon (township) under the administration of Paju, Gyeonggi Province, South Korea. , it administers the following eight villages:
Nosang-ri
Noha-ri
Geogok-ri
Dorasan-ri
Seokgot-ri
Gangjeong-ri
Dongjang-ri
Jeongdong-ri

References 

Towns and townships in Gyeonggi Province
Paju